Homai is a suburb of Auckland in New Zealand surrounded by Manukau Central, Wiri, Hillpark, Clendon Park and Manurewa. It was formerly under the local governance of the Manukau City Council. It has since been integrated with the rest of Auckland under Auckland Council in 2010.

History

In the early 1920s, local residents of Manurewa, including John Dreadon, lobbied the Manurewa Town Board for the creation of a second train station in the area, which opened in 1924. The train station was named Homai, suggested by Auckland resident Maurice Harding, referring to the gift of land and financing that Dreadon and his neighbours gave to create the station. Over time, the name became associated with the suburban area close to the train station. "Homai" is a Māori language verb, meaning "to give (to me)".

Demographics

Homai had a population of 11,931 at the 2018 New Zealand census, an increase of 2,052 people (20.8%) since the 2013 census, and an increase of 2,493 people (26.4%) since the 2006 census. There were 2,604 households, comprising 6,057 males and 5,877 females, giving a sex ratio of 1.03 males per female, with 3,372 people (28.3%) aged under 15 years, 3,345 (28.0%) aged 15 to 29, 4,506 (37.8%) aged 30 to 64, and 714 (6.0%) aged 65 or older.

Ethnicities were 19.8% European/Pākehā, 29.8% Māori, 45.1% Pacific peoples, 22.6% Asian, and 2.5% other ethnicities. People may identify with more than one ethnicity.

The percentage of people born overseas was 36.5, compared with 27.1% nationally.

Although some people chose not to answer the census's question about religious affiliation, 25.5% had no religion, 48.8% were Christian, 2.9% had Māori religious beliefs, 6.8% were Hindu, 2.7% were Muslim, 1.7% were Buddhist and 5.5% had other religions.

Of those at least 15 years old, 897 (10.5%) people had a bachelor's or higher degree, and 2,001 (23.4%) people had no formal qualifications. 498 people (5.8%) earned over $70,000 compared to 17.2% nationally. The employment status of those at least 15 was that 4,275 (49.9%) people were employed full-time, 885 (10.3%) were part-time, and 639 (7.5%) were unemployed.

Education
The school opened in 1960.

Both schools are coeducational. Rolls are as of

References

External links
 Photographs of Homai held in Auckland Libraries' heritage collections.

Suburbs of Auckland